Abaz Karakaçi (born 25 August 1992) is an Albanian professional footballer who plays as a midfielder for Kastrioti Krujë in the Albanian First Division. He was born in Shkodër, Albania.

Club career
On 17 January 2014, Karakaçi completed a transfer to Albanian First Division side Luftëtari Gjirokastër for the second part of 2013–14 season.

On 14 June 2014, Karakaçi was signed by Albanian Superliga side Apolonia Fier on a one-year contract, becoming the club's second signing in summer transfer window.

On 15 September 2017, Karakaçi rejoined Kastrioti Krujë as a free agent. He was released later on 20 April 2018 along with his teammate Alis Boci, terminating his second spell with 15 league appearances.

References

1992 births
Living people
Footballers from Shkodër
Albanian footballers
Association football midfielders
KF Vllaznia Shkodër players
FK Partizani Tirana players
KS Ada Velipojë players
KF Butrinti players
Luftëtari Gjirokastër players
KF Apolonia Fier players
KF Tërbuni Pukë players
KS Kastrioti players
Besëlidhja Lezhë players
KS Egnatia Rrogozhinë players
Kategoria Superiore players
Kategoria e Parë players